Moomin is a rural locality in the Tablelands Region, Queensland, Australia. In the  Moomin had a population of 133 people.

Geography 
The terrain is mountainous with a number of named peaks:

The Herberton railway line ran through the locality but that section of the line closed in 1988, but part of the line remains in use as the Atherton Herberton Historic Railway. There were two railway stations on the line in Moomin:

 Moomin railway station, now abandoned

 The Village railway station, still in use

History 
The locality was named after the railway station on the Tablelands railway line, and is believed to be an Aboriginal word meaning wasp's nest.

Herberton Range Provisional School opened in 1909 and closed in 1910. It was a tent school to provide schooling for the children of railway workers living in railway camps during the construction of the railway through the Herberton Range.

In 1994 a new primary school campus for Herberton State School (then at Grace Street, Herberton) was constructed in Moorim.

In the  Moomin had a population of 133 people.

Education 
Herberton State School is a government primary and secondary (Prep-10) school for boys and girls at Elwyn Phillips Memorial Drive. In 2017, the school had an enrolment of 176 students with 20 teachers (17 full-time equivalent) and 17 non-teaching staff (12 full-time equivalent). It includes a special education program. The secondary (7-10) campus of the school remains at the original school site in Grace Street, Herberton.

For government secondary education to Year 12, the nearest school is Atherton State High School in Atherton to the north-east.

References 

Tablelands Region
Localities in Queensland